Corey Cornelius Hill (October 3, 1978 – May 15, 2015) was an American mixed martial artist. In high school in Florida he won state wrestling championships on multiple occasions and was a two-time national finalist college wrestler.

Mixed martial arts career

The Ultimate Fighter
Hill competed as a lightweight on The Ultimate Fighter 5 television series. During tryouts and production of the show, he told the UFC that his record was 10–0, but it was actually 2–0, both wins from amateur bouts. His first professional fight (albeit technically an exhibition) was on the show. It was scheduled against Gabe Ruediger, but he was expelled from the show for failure to make weight. Instead, Hill's match was against Rob Emerson and he won by a very controversial unanimous decision after three rounds. After defeating Emerson by decision in the preliminaries of TUF 5, Hill went on to lose in the quarterfinals by a triangle choke in the first round to fellow Team Pulver teammate, and future TUF 5 champion, Nate Diaz. Although he lost, Hill's performance validated the comments made several weeks prior by guest coach Jeremy Horn on Episode 3 of TUF 5, who suggested Hill had the potential to be a dominating force in the UFC Lightweight division—even going so far as to offer to train Hill after his run on the show.

Ultimate Fighting Championship
In his UFC debut at UFC Fight Night 12, Corey Hill defeated Joe Veres with a second-round TKO. Hill followed up with an appearance at UFC 86 against former ICON Sport Lightweight champion Justin Buchholz, who submitted him via rear-naked choke in the second round.

During the UFC: Fight for the Troops event in December 2008, Hill broke his right leg while throwing a kick that was checked by Dale Hartt in what is widely considered one of the most gruesome injuries in mixed martial arts history. Recovery from the injury was expected to take 12–18 months. With regard to organizational support, Hill told Kevin Iole of Yahoo! Sports: "The UFC was awesome throughout this whole thing and was so good to me, I feel indebted to them." His major sponsor, Fighter Warehouse, had paid a bonus and the XFC utilized an event which helped to raise money for the injured UFC fighter.

MMA Comeback
On January 23, 2010, Hill picked up a unanimous decision victory in his comeback fight against Jason Trzewieczynski just 13 months after his career-threatening leg injury.

On March 20, 2010, Hill lost to Canadian Mark Holst via kimura submission at XKL: Evolution 1. On July 17, 2010, Hill defeated WEC Veteran Kit Cope at Raging Wolf 8: Cage Supremacy via triangle choke submission and on September 9, 2010, Hill lost to former WEC lightweight champion Rob McCullough at Tachi Palace Fights 6 via unanimous decision.

On July 14, 2012, Hill defeated Darryl Madison at Complete Devastation 5 via anaconda choke submission.

Xtreme Fighting Championships
In November 2011, Hill signed a long term multi-fight contract with XFC.

On December 2, 2011, Hill made his XFC debut getting a first round submission win over Ultimate Fighter alumni Charlie Rader at XFC 15: Tribute.

On December 7, 2012, Hill lost to UFC & Bellator veteran Ryan Thomas at XFC 21: Night of Champions 2 via armbar submission.

Personal life
Hill attended Springstead High School in Spring Hill, Florida. He and his wife Lauran had three children, daughter Seytia and sons Keynan and Corey, Jr. Hill lived in Spring Hill, FL.

Hill also attended Colby Community College in Colby, Kansas, where he was a National champ on a National Championship wrestling team, alongside Daniel Cormier, under coach Steve Lampe.

Death
On May 14, 2015, it was reported that Hill had died after suffering from sudden pneumonia. According to friend Jennifer Swift, he had been diagnosed with pneumonia several weeks prior. It was reported that he underwent a lung transplant, but the lung collapsed. It was also reported that Hill was placed on life support until his family ultimately made the decision to remove him.

Despite a statement from the UFC which claimed that Hill had died, his wife, Lauran Hill, later denied that he had died. She stated: "[Hill] is resting and still alive, and we're praying he makes a full recovery. My husband is fighting for his life. We want him in everyone's prayers." She would not comment on statements made earlier by Hill's close friends and other family members.

Hill died on May 15, 2015, at the age of 36, after suffering a collapsed lung and a heart attack.

Mixed martial arts record

|-
| Loss
| align=center| 6–9
| Jose Caceres
| TKO (retirement)
| Fight Time 23: Mayhem In Miami
| 
| align=center| 1
| align=center| 5:00
| Miami, Florida, United States
| 
|-
| Loss
| align=center| 6–8
| Marcus Andrusia
| TKO (punches)
| VFA: Round 4
| 
| align=center| 1
| align=center| 3:01
| Lake Charles, Louisiana, United States
| 
|-
| Loss
| align=center| 6–7
| Eric Calderon
| Decision (unanimous)
| USFFC 17: Hill vs. Calderon
| 
| align=center| 3
| align=center| 5:00
| Beaufort, South Carolina, United States
| 
|-
| Loss
| align=center| 6–6
| Joe Fye
| Decision (unanimous)
| Sherman Cage Rage - MMA 4
| 
| align=center| 3
| align=center| 5:00
| Stroudsburg, Pennsylvania, United States
| 
|-
| Loss
| align=center| 6–5
| Ryan Thomas
| Submission (armbar)
| XFC 21: Night of Champions 2
| 
| align=center| 1
| align=center| 2:34
| Nashville, Tennessee, United States
| 
|-
| Win
| align=center| 6–4
| Darryl Madison 
| Submission (anaconda choke)
| Complete Devastation 5
| 
| align=center| 1
| align=center| 1:11
| Altoona, Pennsylvania, United States
| 
|-
| Win
| align=center| 5–4
| Charlie Rader
| Submission (D'arce choke)
| XFC 15: Tribute
| 
| align=center| 1
| align=center| 3:58
| Tampa, Florida, United States
| 
|-
| Loss
| align=center| 4–4
| Rob McCullough
| Decision (unanimous)
| TPF 6: High Stakes
| 
| align=center| 3
| align=center| 5:00
| Lemoore, California, United States
| 
|-
| Win
| align=center| 4–3
| Kit Cope
| Submission (triangle choke)
| Raging Wolf 8: Cage Supremacy
| 
| align=center| 1
| align=center| 2:30
| Salamanca, New York, United States
| 
|-
| Loss
| align=center| 3–3
| Mark Holst
| Submission (kimura)
| XKL: Evolution 1
| 
| align=center| 2
| align=center| 4:06
| Ypsilanti, Michigan, United States
| 
|-
| Win
| align=center| 3–2
| Jason Trzewieczynski
| Decision (unanimous)
| Raging Wolf 6: Mayhem in the Mist
| 
| align=center| 3
| align=center| 5:00
| Niagara, New York, United States
| 
|-
| Loss
| align=center| 2–2
| Dale Hartt
| TKO (leg fracture)
| UFC: Fight for the Troops
| 
| align=center| 2
| align=center| 0:20
| Fayetteville, North Carolina, United States
| 
|-
| Loss
| align=center| 2–1
| Justin Buchholz
| Submission (rear naked choke)
| UFC 86
| 
| align=center| 2
| align=center| 3:57
| Las Vegas, Nevada, United States
| 
|-
| Win
| align=center| 2–0
| Joe Veres
| TKO (punches)
| UFC Fight Night 12
| 
| align=center| 2
| align=center| 0:37
| Las Vegas, Nevada, United States
| 
|-
| Win
| align=center| 1–0
| Stryder Fann
| TKO (punches)
| Kickdown Classic 31
| 
| align=center| 1
| align=center| 0:34
| Casper, Wyoming, United States
|

References

External links

 

1978 births
2015 deaths
African-American mixed martial artists
American male mixed martial artists
Respiratory disease deaths in Florida
Deaths from pneumothorax
Lightweight mixed martial artists
Mixed martial artists from Florida
People from Spring Hill, Florida
Ultimate Fighting Championship male fighters
20th-century African-American sportspeople
21st-century African-American sportspeople